Roosevelt Island may refer to:

 Roosevelt Island, New York City, New York, United States
 Roosevelt Island (IND 63rd Street Line), subway station on the island
 Theodore Roosevelt Island, Washington, D.C., United States
 Roosevelt Island, Antarctica